Lattimer is an unincorporated community in Roane County, West Virginia, United States.  Its elevation is 722 feet (220 m).

References

Unincorporated communities in Roane County, West Virginia
Unincorporated communities in West Virginia